Life So Far is the fourth studio album by Canadian country music artist Jason Blaine. It was released on September 27, 2011 by E1 Entertainment. It includes the single "They Don't Make 'Em Like That Anymore."

Track listing

Chart performance

Singles

References

2011 albums
Jason Blaine albums
E1 Music albums